Patricia (Patty) Ann Mothes is an American volcanologist who has spent most of her career working in Ecuador. She is best known for her work on volcanic hazards and risk in Ecuador.

Biography and education
Mothes was born in West Virginia, USA in 1957. She studied geography at University, graduating with a Masters degree from University of Texas, Austin. In 1986, she travelled to Ecuador with a grant from the Inter-American Foundation.

Career
Mothes has worked for the Instituto Geofísico of the Escuela Politécnica Nacional (IG-EPN), in Quito, Ecuador, since 1987. The IG-EPN is the responsible institution in Ecuador for the study of seismic and volcanic risk. Mothes was Head of the Volcanology section of IG-EPN for many years, including during the long-term volcanic eruption sequence at volcan Tungurahua, which began suddenly in 1999, and lasted for over 15 years. As well as her national leadership in volcanology, Mothes is well known for her work on the hazards and risks from lahars, in particular those from Cotopaxi volcano. in 2017, IG-EPN adopted a cartoon figure based on Mothes and called "Patty la Vulcanóloga" to represent the institution on their digital and print media.

In 1993, Mothes was involved in the rescue of scientists who had been caught up in a fatal explosion on Galeras volcano, Colombia, during an international volcanological workshop.

Recognition
Mothes served on the executive committee of the International Association of Volcanology and Chemistry of the Earth's Interior (IAVCEI) from 2011-2015. In December 2022, Mothes was recognised by the Government of Quito with the award of the "Gran Collar Barón de Carondelet". This distinction is reserved for people from outside Ecuador who have contributed to the development and progress of the city of Quito. In January 2023, Mothes was given Honorary Member status of IAVCEI, at the Scientific Assembly in Rotorua.

Family
Mothes is married to the volcanologist Minard L. 'Pete' Hall.

References 

Living people
1957 births
American volcanologists
University of Texas at Austin alumni
Scientists from West Virginia
20th-century American geologists
20th-century American women scientists
21st-century American geologists
21st-century American women scientists
American expatriates in Ecuador